Turacoena is a small genus of doves in the family Columbidae that are found in Indonesia.

The genus was introduced in 1854 by the French naturalist Charles Lucien Bonaparte. The type species is the white-faced cuckoo-dove (Turacoena manadensis). The name Turacoena combines the genus name Turacus introduced by the French naturalist Georges Cuvier in 1800 and the Ancient Greek oinas meaning "pigeon".

The genus includes just 3 species.

 White-faced cuckoo-dove (Turacoena manadensis)
 Sula cuckoo-dove (Turacoena sulaensis)
 Black cuckoo-dove ( Turacoena modesta)

References

 
Bird genera
Taxa named by Charles Lucien Bonaparte